Golden Comics Digest was one of three digest size comics published by Gold Key Comics in the early 1970s. The other two were Mystery Comics Digest and Walt Disney Comics Digest.

Published from 1969 to 1976, all 48 issues were reprints, mainly of various licensed properties. These included Tom and Jerry, Bugs Bunny and other Warner Brothers cartoons, Woody Woodpecker and other Walter Lantz Studios characters, The Pink Panther, various Hanna-Barbera properties, Tarzan, The Lone Ranger, and their own Turok and Brothers of the Spear.

Issue contents
 Tom and Jerry, Woody Woodpecker, Bugs Bunny and friends
 Hanna-Barbera TV Fun Favorites (Space Ghost, The Flintstones, Yogi Bear, The Jetsons, etc.)
 Tom and Jerry, Woody Woodpecker
 Tarzan (plus Brothers of the Spear)
 Tom and Jerry, Woody Woodpecker, Bugs Bunny
 Bugs Bunny
 Hanna-Barbera TV Fun Favorites 
 Tom and Jerry, Woody Woodpecker, Bugs Bunny
 Tarzan (plus Brothers of the Spear)
 Bugs Bunny
 Hanna-Barbera TV Fun Favorites 
 Tom and Jerry, Woody Woodpecker, Bugs Bunny, Journey to the Sun
 Tom and Jerry
 Bugs Bunny Fun Packed Funnies
 Tom and Jerry
 Woody Woodpecker Cartoon Special
 Bugs Bunny
 Tom and Jerry, Barney Bear
 Little Lulu
 Woody Woodpecker Falltime Funtime
 Bugs Bunny Showtime
 Tom and Jerry Winter Wingding
 Little Lulu and Tubby Fun Fling
 Woody Woodpecker Fun Festival
 Tom and Jerry (Doctor Spektor article)
 Bugs Bunny Halloween Hulla-Boo-Loo (Doctor Spektor article)
 Little Lulu and Tubby in Hawaii
 Tom and Jerry
 Little Lulu and Tubby 
 Bugs Bunny Vacation Funnies
 Turok, plus stories from Dell Comics' Indian Chief title
 Woody Woodpecker Summer Fun
 Little Lulu and Tubby Halloween Fun (Doctor Spektor appears)
 Bugs Bunny Winter Funnies
 Tom and Jerry Snowtime Funtime
 Little Lulu and her friends
 Woody Woodpecker Country Fair
 Pink Panther
 Bugs Bunny Summer Fun
 Little Lulu and Tubby Trick or Treat
 Tom and Jerry Winter Carnival
 Bugs Bunny 
 Little Lulu in Paris
 Woody Woodpecker Family Fun Festival
 Pink Panther
 Little Lulu and Tubby 
 Bugs Bunny 
 The Lone Ranger

External links
Former Western Publishing scripter Mark Evanier's comments on the Gold Key digests and their eventual demise

Gold Key Comics titles
Comic book digests
Defunct American comics
1969 comics debuts